The 2005 Pacific Life Pacific-10 Conference men's basketball tournament was played between March 10 and March 12, 2005, at Staples Center in Los Angeles, California.  The champion of the tournament was Washington, which received the Pac-10's automatic bid to the NCAA tournament.  The Most Outstanding Player was Salim Stoudamire of Arizona.

Seeds

The top eight Pacific-10 schools play in the tournament.  Teams are seeded by conference record, with a tiebreaker system used to seed teams with identical conference records.

Bracket

Tournament Notes
Arizona's 31-point victory margin (90-59) over Oregon State in the 2nd round was the largest for any game in this tournament's history. It has since been broken, but still remains the second largest margin.
 This is the first and time only time in Pac-12 Tournament history that the 2 seed beat the 1 seed (as of 2013 these seeds have met 5 times).
 Like the previous two years, no universities met their arch-rival in this year's tournament.
 Three universities each had two players on the all-tournament team, which is the only time this has happened.
 There were no blocked shots in the game between Washington and Arizona, although this has happened in other tournaments.

All tournament team
 Salim Stoudamire, Arizona – Tournament MVP
 Channing Frye, Arizona
 Matt Haryasz, Stanford
 Chris Hernandez, Stanford
 Nate Robinson, Washington
 Tre Simmons, Washington

References

2007–08 Pac-10 Men's Basketball Media Guide pages 50–60 (PDF copy available at 2007–08 Pac-10 Men's Basketball Media Guide)

2004–05 Pacific-10 Conference men's basketball season
Pac-12 Conference men's basketball tournament